The 2000 Campionati Internazionali di Sicilia was a men's tennis tournaments played on outdoor clay courts in Palermo, Italy that was part of the International Series of the 2000 ATP Tour. It was the 22nd edition of the tournament and was held from 25 September until 1 October 2000. Unseeded Olivier Rochus won the singles title.

Finals

Singles

 Olivier Rochus defeated  Diego Nargiso 7–6(16–14), 6–1
 It was Rochus's first singles title of his career.

Doubles

 Tomás Carbonell /  Martín García defeated  Pablo Albano /  Marc-Kevin Goellner walkover

References

External links
 ITF tournament edition details

Campionati Internazionali di Sicilia
Campionati Internazionali di Sicilia
Campionati Internazionali di Sicilia